Jamil Bachir or Bashir (b. Mosul, Iraq, 1920; d. London, September 24, 1977) was an Iraqi musician and expert oud player. The Iraqi Music Institute was opened in 1936, under administration of Hanna Petros (1896–1958), then in 1937 Sherif Muheddin Haydar and other professors joined the faculty of the Institute; Jamil Bashir was enrolled to learn oud with Sherif Muheddin Haydar and violin with Sando Albu. He finished his oud studies in 1943 and his violin study in 1946, and then worked at the Institute as an oud and violin teacher. He also wrote a two-volume oud method. Jamil Bashir was also a good singer, but he did not continue singing as he preferred the oud. He died in London on 24 September 1977.

Personal life
Born in Mosul to an ethnic Assyrian/Syriac Christian family, his father was a singer and a well-known oud player who started to teach him the oud when he was around six years old. Jamil Bashir is the brother of oud player Munir Bashir.

See also 
Omar Bashir 
Munir Bashir

References 

 Rare Recordings of Jamil Bashir

1921 births
1977 deaths
People from Mosul
Iraqi oud players
Iraqi Assyrian people
20th-century Iraqi male singers
Iraqi expatriates in the United Kingdom